Khodutka, also known as Khodutkinskiye Gory,  is a stratovolcano located in the southern part of Kamchatka Peninsula, Russia.

It was formed from an older stratovolcano, known as Priemysh, between the late-Pleistocene and the early Holocene periods.

In about 800 BC, an eruption that was accompanied by small pyroclastic flows, and subsequent emplacement of lava flows and domes, deposited tephra throughout Southern Kamchatka, and formed a twin maar (Khodutkinsky maar) on the WNW slope of Khodutka.

Khodutka is one of a series of volcanoes that surround the city of Petropavlovsk-Kamchatsky, one of the oldest cities in the Far East

Volcanos, mountains, crater lakes and geyser valleys are recreational attractions in the area.

See also
 List of volcanoes in Russia
 List of ultras of Northeast Asia

References

External links
 "Khodutka V., Russia" on Peakbagger

Mountains of the Kamchatka Peninsula
Volcanoes of the Kamchatka Peninsula
Stratovolcanoes of Russia
Pleistocene stratovolcanoes
Holocene stratovolcanoes